The Alliance for Women Film Composers (AWFC) is an organization dedicated to advocacy and visibility for women composers. As of 2019, there are nearly 400 members in the AWFC's database.

History 
The Alliance for Women Film Composers was founded in 2014 by Lolita Ritmanis, Laura Karpman, and Miriam Cutler. Its advocacy work includes a searchable online directory of women composers, interpersonal support, networking events, and live concerts. One such concert was the subject of the 2017 documentary Women Who Score.

Leadership

Current 
 President: Catherine Joy
 Vice President: Sharon Farber
 Secretary: Esin Aydingoz
 Treasurer: Thomas Mikusz
 Director of Membership/ Outreach: Allyson Newman
 Executive Director: Raashi Kulkarni
 Board of Directors:
 Ariel Marx
 Daisy Coole
 Edith Mudge
 Ghiya Rushidat
 Heather McIntosh
 Jenna Fentimen (UK)
 Lili Haydn
 Mandy Hoffman
 Nami Melumad
 Stephanie Economou

Past 

 President: Lolita Ritmanis (2017-2019)
President: Laura Karpman

Founders 

 Lolita Ritmanis
 Laura Karpman
 Miriam Cutler

References

External links 
 

Women's organizations based in the United States
Organizations established in 2014
2014 establishments in the United States